Theodor Valentin Volkmar (23 November 1781 in Frankenberg (Eder) – 8 February 1847 in Marburg) was a German jurist and politician and two-time mayor of Marburg, from 1833 until 1835 and again from December 1835 until his retirement due to ill health November 1846.

References 

1781 births
1847 deaths
People from Waldeck-Frankenberg
Mayors of Marburg
People from the Landgraviate of Hesse-Kassel